Aleksandr Poddubny (born 24 June 1960) is a Kyrgyz fencer. He competed in the individual épée event at the 2000 Summer Olympics.

References

External links
 

1960 births
Living people
Kyrgyzstani male épée fencers
Olympic fencers of Kyrgyzstan
Fencers at the 2000 Summer Olympics
Asian Games medalists in modern pentathlon
Modern pentathletes at the 1994 Asian Games
Fencers at the 2006 Asian Games
Asian Games bronze medalists for Kyrgyzstan
Medalists at the 1994 Asian Games
20th-century Kyrgyzstani people
21st-century Kyrgyzstani people